The Federal Aircraft CM-3 was an aircraft built by mechanics from the Ryan Company.

Design and development 
The CM-3 was designed to be an express mail plane that could also be used for flight training. It had 50 orders, but only one aircraft was completed. The company was dissolved shortly afterward.

The CM-3 was a high-wing strut-braced monoplane with conventional landing gear. The fuselage was made of welded steel tubing with aircraft fabric covering. The aircraft featured dual controls with seating in tandem.

Specifications (Federal Aircraft)

References 

High-wing aircraft